A hyperbaric stretcher is a lightweight pressure vessel for human occupancy (PVHO) designed to accommodate one person undergoing initial hyperbaric treatment during or while awaiting transport or transfer to a treatment chamber.

Originally developed as advanced diving equipment, it has since been used for other medical conditions such as altitude sickness, carbon monoxide poisoning and smoke inhalation, air and gas embolism and is viewed as potentially important equipment for the early treatment of blast related injuries within the combat zone with the anticipated benefit that traumatic brain injury may not develop in the ensuing months.

There is currently only one unit approved under the US National Standard - ASME PVHO-1 (2007) and Case 12. This unit, known as the SOS Hyperlite or by the US military as the EEHS (Emergency Evacuation Hyperbaric Stretcher) is, or has been, in service with the US Army, Navy, Air Force, Coast Guard, NOAA and NASA as well as being supplied to other Government Agencies. The EEHS has a length of 2.26 metres (89 inches) and a diameter of 59 cm. (23.5 inches) and operates at a pressure of up to 2.3 bar (33 psi) above ambient pressure with a built-in safety factor of over 6:1. It is pressurised with air and the occupant breathes oxygen or air through a demand mask (BIBS) during treatment.

References

External links
 SOS Hyperlite

Pressure vessels